The 2008–09 World Series of Poker Circuit is the 5th annual World Series of Poker Circuit.

Event schedule

Notes 

World Series of Poker Circuit
2009 in poker